Vladyslav Vakula (born 29 April 1999) is a Ukrainian professional footballer who plays as a striker for Polissya Zhytomyr, on loan from Shakhtar Donetsk.

Career

Early years
Born in Berdychiv, Vakula is a product of the different cities sportive schools.

Stal Kamianske
In the summer of 2016 Vakula signed a contract with Stal Kamianske and played initially in the Ukrainian Premier League Reserves. He made his debut in the Ukrainian Premier League for Stal Kamianske on 5 August 2017, playing in the match against Karpaty Lviv.

Shakhtar Donetsk

Loan to Desna Chernihiv
On 13 January 2021, he moved on loan to Desna Chernihiv until the end of the 2020–21 season. On 25 January, he made his debut with the new team in the friendly match against Partizan. On 30 January, the loan agreement was terminated by Desna and he was expelled by the club for violating the sports regime, and Vakula returned to Shakhtar Donetsk without playing any official match.

Loan to Vorskla Poltava
In July 2021 he went on loan to Vorskla Poltava and made his debut against Dnipro-1 on 26 July in the Ukrainian Premier League. On 29 July he played in the UEFA Europa Conference League second qualifying round against KuPs, which was lost after two legs.

Personal life
On 8 February 2021, he was involved in a drunken accident in Mariupol, driving a Mercedes in a state of intoxication at about midnight. The incident occurred at the intersection of Flotska and Bakhchivaji streets. A car driven drove onto the sidewalk and knocked down a sign. Fortunately, there were no people on the sidewalk, so no one was hurt. Vladyslav Vakula himself was not injured.

Career statistics

Club

Honours
Shakhtar Donetsk
 Ukrainian Premier League: 2019–20; runner-up: 2020–21

References

External links 

1999 births
Living people
People from Berdychiv
Kharkiv State College of Physical Culture 1 alumni
Ukrainian footballers
FC Stal Kamianske players
FC Mariupol players
FC Shakhtar Donetsk players
FC Desna Chernihiv players
FC Vorskla Poltava players
FC Polissya Zhytomyr players
Ukrainian Premier League players
Association football forwards
Ukraine youth international footballers
Ukraine under-21 international footballers
Sportspeople from Zhytomyr Oblast